The 1972–73 La Liga was the 42nd season since its establishment. It started on September 2, 1972, and finished on May 20, 1973.

Team locations

League table

Results table

Pichichi Trophy

References 
 La Liga 1972-73
 Primera División 1972/73
 Futbolme.com
 All rounds in La Liga 1972/73
 List of La Liga Champions

External links 
  Official LFP Site

1972 1973
1972–73 in Spanish football leagues
Spain